Marlies Göhr ( Oelsner, born 21 March 1958 in Gera) is a former East German track and field athlete, the winner of the 100 metres at the inaugural World Championships in 1983. She ranked in the top 10 of the 100 m world rankings for twelve straight years, ranking first in six of those years. During this time she won many medals as a sprinter at major international championships and set several world records.

Biography

The 1970s 

Competing under her maiden name of Oelsner, Marlies finished second in the 100 m in her first major international at the 1975 European Athletics Junior Championships in Athens.
The following year, at the 1976 Olympic Games in Montreal, she qualified for the 100 m final, finishing eighth, but went on to win her first Olympic gold medal on East Germany's victorious 4 x 100 m relay team.

Her breakthrough year was in 1977, winning the 100 m title at the East German championships at Dresden in a world record time of 10.88 s. This landmark performance was the first time a woman had run under 11 seconds with electronic timing. Later that year, she won the 100 m title at the inaugural World Cup in Düsseldorf, where she also won a silver medal in the relay.

She had a unique style of running, dubbed 'sewing machine' (or 'staccato') for the high frequency of relatively short-paced strides (this is very easy to see in the 1977 World Cup ).

Marlies continued to dominate in 1978, competing under her married name of Göhr. She won the gold medal in the 100 m in that year's European Championships in Prague and was just beaten by one hundredth of a second in the 200 m by Lyudmila Kondratyeva (Soviet Union).

In 1979, at the World Cup in Montreal, she was beaten into second place in the 100 m by Evelyn Ashford (U.S.), thus starting a competitive rivalry.

The 1980s 
In early 1980 Göhr confirmed herself as the firm favourite for the Olympic 100 m title.  During a two-week span in May she ran 10.98 s at Potsdam, followed by an 11.00 s at Jena and at Dresden she ran a fast 10.93 sec, second only to her own world record time of 10.88 s. At the Moscow Olympic Games Göhr's main opposition was Lyudmila Kondratyeva (Soviet Union) who had beaten Göhr in the 200 m at the 1978 European Championships. Göhr got a bad start in the final and was edged out by Kondratyeva, who made a final lunge near the finish to win the gold medal, again by one hundredth of a second. Six days later, Göhr lined up for the 4 x 100 m relay final and anchored the team home to win the gold medal in a world record of 41.60 s.

Göhr made a good start to the 1981 season winning her third consecutive European Cup 100 m title at Zagreb in 11.17 s.  Yet, on the world stage at the World Cup in Rome, Göhr had to settle for less than gold, again beaten by Evelyn Ashford, as well as by Kathy Smallwood (Great Britain). The following year at the 1982 European Championships in Athens, Göhr won in 11.01 s, becoming the first woman to defend the title.

The Göhr/Ashford rivalry blossomed in 1983, when both broke the world record. Firstly, Göhr broke her own world record at the Olympic Day meet in East Berlin winning in a time of 10.81 s. This record lasted less than a month, however, since Ashford broke it with a 10.79 s. Both athletes were in top form leading up to the inaugural World Championships, held in Helsinki. Both Göhr and Ashford won their respective semi-finals. Unfortunately, the final was anticlimactic since Ashford tore her hamstring during the race. Göhr won the gold medal from compatriot Marita Koch in 10.97 s, and she won a second gold medal in the 4 x 100 m relay.

Marlies Göhr and Evelyn Ashford continued their dominance of the 100 m in 1984, recording the season's fastest 10 times between them. Unfortunately, Göhr was unable to compete at that year's Olympic Games in Los Angeles, because of the boycott by the Eastern Bloc countries. Ashford, unchallenged, went on to win the gold medal. Ashford's time of 10.97 secs was the first time a woman had run a legal sub-11 second clocking in the Olympic Games. They had a showdown in Zurich, in which Ashford won setting a new world record of 10.76 to Gohr's 10.84.

In 1986, Göhr was focused on retaining her 100 m title at the European Championships in Stuttgart. She defended her title with a season's best time of 10.91 s and became the first woman to win three European 100 m titles. She then won a second gold medal in the 4 x 100 m relay. In October 1986, she was awarded a Star of People's Friendship in gold (second class) for her sporting success.

Göhr's last two appearances in major international championships were at the 1987 World Championships in Athletics in Rome and at the 1988 Olympic Games in Seoul. She was eliminated in the semi-finals of the 100 m in Rome but won a silver medal in the 4 x 100 m relay. At the Olympics, she was again eliminated in the 100 m semi-finals, but she won another silver in the relay. Ashford, anchoring the USA team, made up a three-metre deficit and won by a clear metre over Göhr.

Drug testing
With the fall of the Berlin Wall in 1989, Stasi (secret police) files suggested widespread official doping under the East German regime.

Despite these reports, Göhr only tested positive for androgenic steroids in 1975 as a 17-year-old, and has maintained she never used them again.

Achievements

World records

See also 
 Women's 100 metres world record progression
 List of Olympic medalists in athletics (women)
 European Indoor Athletics champions
 German all-time top lists – 100 metres
 German all-time top lists – 200 metres

References

External links 

 
 
 
 Profile at Sporting-Heroes.net

1958 births
Living people
Sportspeople from Gera
People from Bezirk Gera
East German female sprinters
Olympic athletes of East Germany
Athletes (track and field) at the 1976 Summer Olympics
Athletes (track and field) at the 1980 Summer Olympics
Athletes (track and field) at the 1988 Summer Olympics
World Athletics Championships athletes for East Germany
Olympic gold medalists for East Germany
Olympic silver medalists for East Germany
World record setters in athletics (track and field)
World Athletics Championships medalists
European Athletics Championships medalists
Medalists at the 1988 Summer Olympics
Medalists at the 1980 Summer Olympics
Medalists at the 1976 Summer Olympics
Olympic gold medalists in athletics (track and field)
Olympic silver medalists in athletics (track and field)
Universiade medalists in athletics (track and field)
Recipients of the Patriotic Order of Merit in gold
Universiade gold medalists for East Germany
World Athletics Championships winners
Medalists at the 1979 Summer Universiade
Olympic female sprinters
Friendship Games medalists in athletics